Serbian enclaves are settlements in Kosovo outside North Kosovo ("south of the Ibar") where Serbs form a majority. After the initial outflow after the Kosovo War the situation of the Kosovo Serb communities has improved and under the Ahtisaari plan minority rights have been promoted.

Serbs have often built roadblocks and barricades, to prevent access by Kosovo Police and customs officers. The 2013 Brussels Agreement allowed full operation of Kosovo Police and customs officials, while the Community of Serb Municipalities is planned to be created within the Republic of Kosovo legal framework.

History
According to the 1991 census in Yugoslavia, there were five municipalities with a Serb majority in the Autonomous Province of Kosovo and Metohija. Those were: Leposavić, Zvečan, Zubin Potok, Štrpce and Novo Brdo. The remaining municipalities had an Albanian majority, while other significant ethnic minorities (such as ethnic Muslims and Romani) did not form majorities in any of the municipalities.

Prior to the 1999 Kosovo War, there were many more Serbs living in the territory of Kosovo. Many of them left in 1999, and some more left during the 2004 unrest, when the Serb community and Serbian cultural heritage were targeted, and as a result 35 churches, including 18 monuments of culture, were demolished, burnt or severely damaged. Estimates of the number of Serbs thus displaced range from 65,000 to 250,000 Only about 3.000 of them have returned since. Based on Serbian former Ministry for Kosovo and Metohija, 312 of 437 towns and villages in which Serbs lived were completely ethnically cleansed, and in the ensuing violence, more than 1.000 Serbs were killed, while 841 were kidnapped and 960 wounded.

Between 2000 and 2008, the UNMIK administration created eight new municipalities on the territory of Kosovo, three of which have an ethnic Serb majority: Gračanica, Klokot-Vrbovac and Ranilug. In 2008, the Community Assembly of Kosovo and Metohija was created to coordinate the efforts of the Serbian minority in Kosovo. There are some 120,000 Serbs in Kosovo, of whom about a third are in the north. They believe that if Republic of Kosovo government officials are deployed on the border, Kosovo will eventually take control of the north, which is now a de facto part of Serbia. Kosovo's Serbs, especially in the north, reject its independence.

During the ethnic tensions in the 2004 unrest in Kosovo, numerous Serb enclaves were assaulted by Kosovo Albanian rioters.

Demographics

Municipalities
 
According to the 2011 census, which was boycotted in North Kosovo and partially boycotted by Serbs in southern Kosovo, the municipalities of Gračanica, Parteš and Ranilug (enclaves, outside North Kosovo) have a Serb majority, while Serbs form about 45% of the total population of Novo Brdo, Štrpce and Klokot.

Towns and villages

The administrative division given there represents settlements within their former municipalities. From 2009 to 2010, the new municipalities were formed of settlements with Serbian ethnic majority, in order to establish Community of Serb Municipalities in Kosovo. These municipalities are: Gračanica/Graçanicë, Klokot/Kllokot, Ranilug/Ranillugë, Parteš/Parteshi and Novo Brdo/Artana.

The former administrative division of municipalities with Serbian settlements:
Vushtrri/Vučitrn municipality: Gojbulja, Panjetina, Prilužje (more than 3,000 Serbs), Grace
City of Pristina: Plemetina, Gračanica
Lipjan/Lipljan municipality: Dobrotin, Livađe, Donja Gušterica, Gornja Gušterica, Suvi Do, Staro Gracko, Novo Naselje
Fushë Kosova/Kosovo Polje municipality: Batuse
Gjilan/Gnjilane municipality: Šilovo, Pasjane, Parteš (new municipality), Koretište, Donja Budriga, Stanišor, Kusce, Straža, G.Makreš, Kmetovce, Poneš
Peja/Peć municipality: Goraždevac; plurality: Belo Polje
Burim/Istok municipality: Osojane, Crkolez
Rahovec/Orahovac municipality: Velika Hoča (1,200 Serbs)
Skënderaj/Srbica municipality: Banja, Suvo Grlo
Dardana/Kosovska Kamenica municipality: Ranilug, Ropotovo, Donje Korminjane
Viti/Vitina municipality: Klokot, Vrbovac, Trpeza, Novo Selo, Žitinje
Artana/Novo Brdo municipality: Prekovce
Klina municipality: Vidanje
Theranda/Suva Reka municipality: Popovljane, Dvorane, Delovce; plurality: Mušutište, Topličane

Smaller Serbian communities are also present in Prizren, Gjilan and Kastriot (Obiliq).

Serbian-language media in enclaves
 RadioKiM
 Klokot radio
 Radio Kontaktplus North Kosovska Mitrovica
 RTV Puls

See also
Enclave (film), a 2015 Serbian film

Notes and references
Notes

References

External links

 
Kosovo–Serbia border